Helochara is a genus of leafhoppers in the family Cicadellidae. There are about six described species in Helochara.

Species
These six species belong to the genus Helochara:
 Helochara communis Fitch, 1851 c g b (bog leafhopper)
 Helochara delta Oman, 1943 c g
 Helochara deltoides Hamilton, 1986 c g b
 Helochara forceps Hamilton, 1986 c g
 Helochara inflatoseta (Lethierry, 1890) c g
 Helochara mexicana Hamilton, 1986 c g
Data sources: i = ITIS, c = Catalogue of Life, g = GBIF, b = Bugguide.net

References

Further reading

External links

 

Cicadellidae genera
Cicadellini